St. Olaf or St. Olave or St. Olav may refer to:

People
 King Olaf II of Norway (995–1030)

Institutions
St. Olaf College, a private, liberal arts college in Northfield, Minnesota
St. Olaf Choir, the a cappella choir of St. Olaf College

Places
St Olave Silver Street, London
St Olave District (Metropolis), London
St. Olaf, Iowa, city, United States
St. Olaf Township, Otter Tail County, Minnesota, United States
St. Olaf's church, Tallinn, 12th-century church in Tallinn, Estonia, the world's tallest building from 1549 to 1625
Olavinlinna (St. Olaf's Castle), 15th-century castle in Savonlinna, Finland
St. Olaf Kirke, a historical Lutheran church located near Cranfills Gap, Texas, United States
St. Olaf, Minnesota, a fictional town often referred to on the television series The Golden Girls

See also
 Olaf (disambiguation)
 Olave (disambiguation)
 St. Olave's Church (disambiguation)